Creative Construction Company Vol. II (also referred to as CCC Vol. II) is a 1976 album by the jazz collective Creative Construction Company, originally released on the Muse label.

Reception

AllMusic awarded the album 2 stars with its review by Eugene Chadbourne stating, "Braxton and company were going somewhere else of great interest by not relying constantly on jazz chops or a standard rhythm section sound, and the guests on this date seem to be blocking the road".

Track listing 
All compositions by Leroy Jenkins
 "No More White Gloves – Part I (With Sand Under Your Shoes Doing a Dance)" - 17:30
 "No More White Gloves – Part II (With Sand Under Your Shoes Doing a Dance)" - 16:58

Personnel 
 Anthony Braxton - alto saxophone, soprano saxophone, clarinet, flute, contrabass clarinet, chimes
 Leroy Jenkins - violin, viola, recorder, toy xylophone, harmonica, bicycle horn
 Leo Smith - trumpet, flugelhorn, French horn, seal horn, percussion
 Muhal Richard Abrams - piano, cello, clarinet
 Richard Davis - bass
 Steve McCall - drums, percussion

References 

Creative Construction Company albums
Muse Records live albums
1976 live albums